Carla Zambelli Salgado de Oliveira (born 3 July 1980) is a Brazilian right-wing activist and politician. Founder of the movement On the Streets, Zambelli gained notoriety through her activism in favor of the impeachment of the ex-president Dilma Rousseff. In the elections of 2018, she was elected federal deputy for São Paulo, by the Social Liberal Party (PSL).

Her profile has been described by some as belonging to the political far-right, being economically liberal and socially conservative.

Biography and views
Zambelli was born on 3 July 1980 in Ribeirão Preto, São Paulo, Brazil.

In 2017 she declared herself a monarchist, after conversations with members of the imperial family. She is against the quota policy, except for people with disabilities.
 
In the elections of 2018, she was elected federal deputy by the PSL. She said that her line of action in the Chamber of Deputies will continue to be the fight against corruption. According to Zambelli, this will be done through three pillars: "less state, more justice and real education."

In April 2022, she stated that she was gathering support for fellow lawmaker Daniel Silveira to be given amnesty.

COVID-19
On May 30, 2020, while on the  show, Zambelli stated that empty coffins were being buried in the state of Ceará, supposedly as an attempt to inflate COVID-19 death statistics. The photograph mentioned by Zambelli as evidence was later shown to have been taken in 2017, in the state of São Paulo, and was part of an investigation of a case of life insurance fraud. Zambelli's statement prompted Ceará's government to declare they would take "appropriate judicial measures".

On August 18, 2020, Zambelli's press service announced she had contracted COVID-19, and would begin treatment using hydroxychloroquine. Despite its potential negative health side effects, Zambelli has praised the drug on multiple occasions, and attributed the First Lady Michelle Bolsonaro's recovery of COVID-19 to hydroxychloroquine.

On August 24, 2020, Zambelli was hospitalized for "clinical exams and the investigation of an autoimmune disease". Two days later, on August 26, 2020, Zambelli posted on Twitter that she was "100% cured" due to early treatment using hydroxychloroquine. However, on August 28, 2020, the hospital that had admitted her denied she had contracted COVID-19 in the first place, and stated the following:

After the statement, Zambelli claimed her COVID-19 test was a false positive. Following the controversy and public outcry, Zambelli deleted the tweet where she attributed her recovery to the use of hydroxychloroquine.

In March 2022, Zambelli launched a website to provide resources for those who did not wish to receive the COVID-19 vaccination, citing an excerpt for Brazil's Civil Code stating that "no one can be compelled to submit, at the risk of life, to medical treatment or surgical intervention. Zambelli was filmed on the eve of the November 2022 presidential elections, in Jardins, a neighborhood in the central area of the capital of São Paulo, entering a bar with a revolver in hand. She was caught on camera wielding a pistol and chasing a journalist, and later fled Brazil to Florida for three weeks. On the day of the approach, Zambelli was not arrested in the act.

Controversies

Arrest for defamation of federal deputy 
The accusation came after Zambelli claimed she was "working, unlike them, who were stealing". Pimenta had legislative police escort her to the police station inside the Congress. The deputy, however, did not press charges against Zambelli.

Defamation of Jean Wyllys 
In 2018, Zambelli was condemned over her online accusations of pedophilia against Jean Wyllys, a political opponent. After court battles, she organized a Crowdfund among her supporters, refusing to pay legal damages personally.

Alleged nepotism 
Zambelli claimed she had to request her son be admitted because they had previously received "threats". When questioned, the school responded that the Army's Commander is entitled to evaluate cases "considered to be special".

Threatening man with a gun 
In October 2022, less than a day before the 2022 elections, Zambelli chased a man down the street who was arguing with her group of friends about politics. She then proceeded to point a pistol at him and shoot into the air, chasing the man down streets and into a bar. She yelled at him to lay on the floor and coerced him into apologizing. She later claimed he had assaulted her, although this was proven a lie after videos of the exact moment were released. As of now, opposing deputies are proposing to revoke her mandate as well as putting her in jail for breaking a federal law that prohibits anyone to bear guns within 24 hours of the election.

References

External links
 Carla Zambelli on Facebook
 Carla Zambelli on Instagram
 Carla Zambelli on Twitter
 Profile in the Chamber of Deputies

1980 births
Brazilian activists
Conservatism in Brazil
Liberal Party (Brazil, 2006) politicians
People from Ribeirão Preto
Brazilian monarchists
Living people
Members of the Chamber of Deputies (Brazil) from São Paulo
Former feminists
Controversies in Brazil